Gamaliel Bradford may refer to:
 Gamaliel Bradford (privateersman) (1768–1824), American privateersman
 Gamaliel Bradford (abolitionist) (1795–1839), American physician and early abolitionist from Boston
 Gamaliel Bradford (banker) (1831–1911), American banker from Boston who helped organize the American Anti-Imperialist League
 Gamaliel Bradford (biographer) (1863–1932), American biographer, critic, poet, and dramatist